

207001–207100 

|-bgcolor=#f2f2f2
| colspan=4 align=center | 
|}

207101–207200 

|-id=109
| 207109 Stürmenchopf ||  || The Stürmenchopf, a sugarloaf mountain located in the South of Laufon, Switzerland. || 
|}

207201–207300 

|-bgcolor=#f2f2f2
| colspan=4 align=center | 
|}

207301–207400 

|-id=319
| 207319 Eugenemar ||  || Eugene Y. Mar (born 1956), humanitarian, healer, and physician at Tucson Orthopedic Institute || 
|-id=321
| 207321 Crawshaw ||  || Steven A. Crawshaw (born 1950), director of the Introductory Physics and Astronomy Labs at the University of Arkansas, United States || 
|-id=341
| 207341 Isabelmartin ||  || Isabel Lacruz Martin (born 1956), doctorate graduated from Experimental Psychology at Kent State University in 2005 || 
|-id=385
| 207385 Maxou ||  || Max Aebischer (1914–2009),  mayor of Fribourg, Switzerland, from 1960 to 1966, and director of the Education Department at the University of Fribourg. His nickname "Maxou" is a variation of "Max" in Alemannic German. || 
|}

207401–207500 

|-id=420
| 207420 Jehin ||  || Emmanuel Jehin (born 1973) is a Senior Research Associate at the Universite de Liège, Belgium. He is the principal investigator of the TRAPPIST telescopes and his research includes observations and characterization of comets, with a particular focus on production rate determination. || 
|}

207501–207600 

|-id=504
| 207504 Markusovszky ||  || Lajos Markusovszky (1815–1893) was a physician, a military doctor, an organizers of modern Hungarian health education, and a member of the Hungarian Academy of Sciences. He was the founder of the Hungarian Medical Journal, and later an advisor to the Ministry for Religion and Education regarding university affairs. || 
|-id=547
| 207547 Charito || 2006 LO || Rosario Lacruz Martín ("Charito"; born 1961), astronomer at Monte del Pardo, Madrid || 
|-id=563
| 207563 Toscana || 2006 PC || The Italian region of Tuscany (Toscana), widely known for its landscapes, traditions, history and heritage || 
|-id=585
| 207585 Lubar ||  || The ancient city of Bolokhov, capital of the Bolokhov principality in the times of Russian Kiev. It is currently known as Lubar. || 
|}

207601–207700 

|-id=603
| 207603 Liuchaohan ||  || Liu Chao-Han (born 1939), a Taiwanese physicist and educator who served as President of National Central University from 1990 to 2003. || 
|-id=655
| 207655 Kerboguan ||  || The National Museum of Natural Science (Kerboguan), a combined science center and natural history museum, is the first and the largest museum of natural science in Taiwan. It entertains more than three million visitors annually, and has become an important educational base for natural science since it opened in 1986. || 
|-id=657
| 207657 Mangiantini || 2007 PA || Giovanni Mangiantini (1947–2006), Italian amateur astronomer || 
|-id=661
| 207661 Hehuanshan ||  || Mount Hehuan is a 3416-m mountain in Central Taiwan. The peak lies on the boundaries of Nantou and Hualien counties and is within the Taroko Gorge National Park. The Taiwan Star Party is held in the Hehuan Mountains every year. || 
|-id=666
| 207666 Habibula ||  || Gilles Habibula, one of the main characters of the space opera Legion of Space || 
|-id=681
| 207681 Caiqiao || 2007 QO || Cai Qiao (1897–1990), Chinese physiologist and member of the Chinese Academy of Sciences || 
|-id=687
| 207687 Senckenberg ||  || Johann Christian Senckenberg (1707–1772), a German physician and naturalist in his native city of Frankfurt || 
|-id=695
| 207695 Olgakopyl ||  || Olga Andrivna Kopyl (born 1950), director of Zhytomyr Museum of Astronautics and a historian of cosmonautics in Russia and Ukraine || 
|}

207701–207800 

|-id=715
| 207715 Muqinshuijiao ||  || Muqinshuijiao (Water cellar for Mothers) is a charity project implemented by the China Women's Development Foundation. || 
|-id=716
| 207716 Wangxichan ||  || Wang Xichan (1628–1682) was a Chinese astronomer of the late Ming and early Qing Dynasty, who developed a computational method to calculate accurately the times of transits of Venus and Mercury. He also published several astronomical works. || 
|-id=717
| 207717 Sa'a ||  || Sanya City (local pronunciation Sa'a), founded in 110 B.C. as Ngaiziu. It is the southernmost city of China. || 
|-id=723
| 207723 Jiansanjiang ||  || Jiansanjiang, located in the hinterland of Sanjiang Plain, is known as "China Green Rice City". Its Honghe farm is the first modernized farm in China. || 
|-id=754
| 207754 Stathiskafalis ||  || Stathis Kafalis (born 1962) is a German engineer, amateur astronomer and telescope maker with Greek roots. He promotes astronomy via his mirror-grinding courses and he has helped many amateur astronomer to build their own telescope. || 
|-id=763
| 207763 Oberursel ||  || The German town of Oberursel in Hesse || 
|}

207801–207900 

|-id=809
| 207809 Wuzuze ||  || Wu Zuze (born 1935), an academician of the Chinese Academy of Sciences, is the founder of hematopoietic stem cell research and a pioneer of Experimental Hematology in China. || 
|-id=899
| 207899 Grinmalia ||  || Eugene Grinishyn (born 1956), a stonemason, and Sergiy Malinovskiy (born 1964), a farmer, are neighbors of the Andrushivka Astronomical Observatory in Ukraine || 
|}

207901–208000 

|-
| 207901 Tzecmaun ||  || The Tzec Maun Foundation, a foundation that provides free access to remote-controlled telescopes || 
|-id=931
| 207931 Weihai ||  || The Chinese city of Weihai, a widely known harbor and tourist city, as well as the location of the Shandong University || 
|}

References 

207001-208000